Taiwan Bank or Taiwan Shoal, is an ocean bank located on the seabed at the southern end of the Taiwan Strait. It is to the southwest of Penghu Islands and to the east of the Nanpeng Islands.

Taiwan Bank is a residual sedimentation of continental shelf. The undersea terrain of the Taiwan strait used to be a valley, and have been constantly accumulating soil and sand from both sides since Pliocene period, until Holocene period when sea level rises, remain of sands beneath the sea become oceanic bank.

Kuroshio Current and typhoon wave help push sands on the seabed to the north, but are blocked by ancient volcanic rocks and beach rocks and thus while the sands are constantly moving they would not be transported to weak current area faraway. On the other hand, south-flowing currents and wave cause by northeasterly trade wind transport sands on the bank south. These forces in both directions cancel out each others reached relative stability and equilibrium, forming sand waves and dunes under the sea.

Some academics have hypothesized that during the Little Ice Age when the sea level dropped, Taiwan Bank might be inhabitable by human. Thus they think the island marked Dongning on a map Kunyu Wanguo Quantu published in year 1602 could in fact be Taiwan Bank instead of the Taiwan Island.

Resource dispute 

Due to rich construction grade sand deposit on Taiwan Bank, in recent years many Mainland China ships have tried to gather sands from the area, due to restriction by Chinese government against gathering of sand within Chinese river and near coastal area of China.

References 

Taiwan Strait
Shoals